John J. Sampson is an American lawyer, currently the William Benjamin Wynne Professor at University of Texas School of Law. He is also in the American Association of Law Libraries's Hall of Fame.

References

Year of birth missing (living people)
Living people
University of Texas at Austin faculty
American lawyers